To be scared is to have fear.

Scared may also refer to:

Film and television
 Scared!, a paranormal reality TV series
 Scared (film), a 2005 Thai horror film

Music
 Scared Records, an American record label
 "Scared" (The Tragically Hip song), 1995
 "Scared", a song by Ashanti from Ashanti, 2002
 "Scared", a song by John Lennon from Walls and Bridges, 1974
 "Scared", a song by Paul McCartney from New, 2013
 "Scared", a song by Three Days Grace from Three Days Grace, 2003
 "Scared", a song by Zendaya from Zendaya, 2013
 Scared, an EP by Swingin' Utters, 1992

Acronyms
 Screen for child anxiety related disorders, a screening measure for anxiety symptoms in children and adolescents

See also
Scary (disambiguation)